Zhari is a district in Kandahar Province, Afghanistan.
Alternative spellings include Zheley (due to transliteration from Pashto), Zharey, Zharay, Zheri, or Zheray.  The district was created in 2004 from land that was formerly part of Maywand and Panjwai districts. The population is estimated at 80,700 (2010).

Geography 

Zhari lies on the north bank of the Arghandab River, which runs east to west through Kandahar Province.  The general area is sometimes referred to as the Arghandab Valley.  The built-up and farmed area of Zhari is approximately 30 km east to west by 8 km north to south, between the river and Highway 1.

Most buildings are single-story mud structures, with narrow, winding roads and walkways.  The exceptions are the grape-drying huts, which are larger buildings, as high as 20m, scattered throughout the countryside.  Grapes, opium poppies and cannabis (for hashish) are the most common crops.  The farmlands are irrigated by a complex system of wadis running parallel with the Arghandab River. The area north of Highway 1 is more desert-like with abrupt mountain ranges of approximately 200–400m in height.

History
The district was created from land that was formerly part of Maywand and Panjwai districts in 2004. It was created by President Hamid Karzai as reward for Habibullah Jan, an Alizai warlord who had helped defeat the Taliban in Kandahar.

Politics 

The Shurah is the basic mechanism of government in Zhari.  The tribal nature of the district is inseparable from politics, making the decision-making process difficult and time-consuming.

The Zhari District Center, the seat of government for the district, is located near the Pasab Bazaar at Pasab.  The district center is also adjacent to Forward Operating Base Pasab (FOB Pasab), a former Coalition Forces base now controlled by the Afghan National Security Forces.

Jamal Agha is the district governor as of 28 March 2015. Muhammed Naez Sarhadi and Karim Jan were previous governors. Mohammad Masoum Khan leads the Afghan National Police forces in the district as of 26 January 2015.

Tribes 
Most people in Zhari are ethnic Pashtuns.  There are at least a dozen tribes, the most numerous of which are the Alizai, Achakzai, Noorzai and Ghilzai. Many nomadic tribes pass through the northern areas of Zhari between Maywand and Arghandab districts.

Sub-districts

The political geography of Zhari changes over time.  Many of the smaller villages bear the name of the local elder.  A collection of these smaller villages can be loosely described as a sub-district.  Zhari currently has the following sub-districts:
 Nar Kariz
 Nalgham
 Sangsar
 Kolk
 Gariban
 Siah Choy
 Sablaghay
 Pashmul
 Asequeh
 Sanzari

Conflict, 2001–2021 

NATO and ISAF continue their efforts to support the Karzai government and quell an insurgency.  The Taliban is deeply rooted in Zhari's history and attempt to exert influence through a system of mullahs and elders (see Resurgence of Taliban).  The situation is complicated by the warlords and criminals who also attempt to minimize the government's power in the area to further their own ends.

A 2 am raid on 18 October 2006 by NATO helicopters, hunting Taliban fighters, was only half a mile from the scene of September's 2006 Operation Medusa, one of the most ferocious battles between Western forces and insurgents since the ouster of the Taliban regime in 2001.

On 4 October 2013, 4 U.S. Special Operations soldiers were killed and 12 wounded during an operation in the Zhari District. The coalition soldiers were killed by a set of IEDs and a suicide bomber. A Taliban spokesman claims explosives were placed in a house and detonated when soldiers entered. As other soldiers entered to assist the fallen, a suicide bomber detonated his explosives.

See also 
Khosrow Sofla
Tarok Kolache

References

External links
 Map of the well populated parts and boundaries of the district, Institute for the Study of War

Districts of Kandahar Province